Ulrich Meyer-Bothling is an English ophthalmic surgeon. He is founding member and also the Clinical Director of the Diabetic Retinopathy Screening service for Surrey.

Meyer-Bothling is a consultant ophthalmic surgeon who practises in the South East of England, United Kingdom. He has a research background in glaucoma and specialist training in retinal diseases. He specialises in complex cataract surgery and in the 1990s he began publishing the advantages of performing small incision cataract surgery under topical anaesthesia.

Education
Meyer-Bothling spent his childhood in France, where his parents were accredited with the diplomatic service, and later in Germany. In 1980 he won a scholarship to attend the sixth form United World College of the Atlantic in Wales, UK, from which he graduated with the International Baccalaureate. Meyer-Bothling then attended the University of Hamburg (Germany) to study Medicine. He studied Haematology at the University of Rochester (USA), Neurology at the University of Oxford (UK), Infectious diseases at Yale University (USA) and General Surgery at the University of Melbourne (Australia). He then completed his dual MD/PhD degree.

Professional work
For his research on T-Lymphocyte subsets in Myasthenia gravis Meyer-Bothling received a PhD (magna cum laude) from the University of Hamburg.

From 1990 to 1992 Meyer-Bothling was a research fellow at the Nuffield Laboratory of Ophthalmology in Oxford. He was awarded a Master of Science from the University of Oxford for exploring the role of serotonin and related substances in the regulation of intraocular pressure.

His clinical residency was spent at the University of Hamburg, where he left in 1997 as a specialist in retinal surgery. He became one of three partners in a large day surgery centre in Hamburg. This practice of three eye surgeons performed over 3000 surgical procedures every year.

In 2000 Meyer-Bothling left Hamburg to do further clinical work and research as a fellow at Moorfields Eye Hospital in London.

At the age of 38, he was appointed Consultant Ophthalmic Surgeon by Ashford and St. Peter’s Hospitals NHS Trust, where he runs speciality services in cataract, glaucoma and diabetic retinopathy. Meyer-Bothling has a wide referral base for his private practice, which operates from various locations in West London and Surrey.

In 2008 Meyer-Bothling was appointed Clinical Director of the Diabetic Retinopathy Screening Service in Surrey.

Meyer-Bothling has published his basic science research, in his early years mainly glaucoma related (Neurobiology of Serotonin), later he published mainly clinical research. He co-authored the standard textbook "Emergency Medicine" (ophthalmology section), which is now in its fourth edition, and the OPHDA Ophthalmology databank.

Degrees and awards
 International Baccalaureate
 MD, University of Hamburg
 PhD, University of Hamburg
 MSc, University of Oxford
 FRCOphth, London
 Scholarship by the Studienstiftung des deutschen Volkes to attend the United World College of the Atlantic, Wales, 1980–82.
 Grant by the German Academic Exchange Service to study at the University of Melbourne/ Australia, 1988.
 Scholarship by the Royal Society and the Deutsche Forschungsgemeinschaft to perform research at the University of Oxford, 1990–92.
 "Glaxo Junior Research Fellow" at Green College, Oxford, 1991–92.
 Research grant from the Claere-Jung-Stiftung, 1996.

Extracurricular activities
Meyer-Bothling has travelled widely throughout Europe, Asia, the Americas, Africa and Australia. During his student and early residency years he regularly worked as a tour guide in China. He speaks English, French and German. He is a keen keyboard player (organ, piano and accordion), enjoys hiking and sailing and is an avid skier. Over the past few years Meyer-Bothling and his family have financially supported the United World Colleges, Green Templeton College, Oxford (UK), the Eastman School of Music, the Hochstein School of Music and the Al Sigl Rehabilitation Center (USA). He is married with four children and lives in Surrey/England.

Selected publications
 Meyer-Bothling U, Osborne NN, Bron AJ: Further evidence for the role of serotonin in the front of the eye. Documenta Ophthalmologica 80(3):226, 1991.
 Meyer-Bothling U, Barnett NL, Bron AJ, Osborne NN: Serotonin effects on the iris ciliary body and intraocular pressure in the rabbit. Invest Ophthalmol Vis Sci (Suppl.)33(4):1179, 1992.
 Meyer-Bothling U, Bron AJ, Osborne NN: Topical serotonin or the 5-HT1a-agonist 5-CT increase intraocular pressure in rabbits. Invest Ophthalmol Vis Sci 34:3035–3042, 1993.
 Osborne NN, Meyer-Bothling U, Barnett NL: Serotonin receptors in the eye. Chapter 12, pp. 331–364. In: Encounters in Glaucoma Research I: Receptor Biology and Glaucoma. Anderson DR, Drance SM (eds); Fogliazza Editore, 1994.
 Meyer-Bothling U, Bron AJ, Osborne NN: The Effect of indole-like compounds on rabbit intraocular pressure. Documenta Ophthalmologica 85(4):384, 1994.
 Meyer-Bothling U, Bron AJ, Osborne NN: Evidence for an adrenergic innervation of the rat Meibomian Glands. Invest Ophthalmol Vis Sci (Suppl.) 35(4):1789, 1994.
 Meyer-Bothling U, Bialasiewicz AA, Ma JX, Schaudig U: Substitution of conjunctival goblet cells by ileal mucosa grafting for severe mucus deficiency after  lye burns. Documenta ophthalmologica 83:1995.
 Schaudig U, Ma JX, Bialasiewicz AA, Meyer-Bothling U: Secondary glaucoma and lymphocytic tumor infiltrates in necrotising malignant melanomas of the choroid. Der Ophthalmologe 92 Suppl 1,82,1995.
 Meyer-Bothling U, Bialasiewicz AA, Richard G: Acute retinal necrosis: two cases with giant retinal tear. Der Ophthalmologe 93 Suppl 1,110, 1996.
 Meyer-Bothling U, Bialasiewicz AA, Schaudig U, Richard G: Immunohistochemical identification of conjunctival human papilloma virus infections. Vision Research 36 Suppl, 10/1996.
 Richard G, Meyer-Bothling U: Editorial: Angioneogenesis – the key etiology in many cases of blindness. Klin Monatsbl Augenheilkd 208:III-IV. April 1996.
 Meyer-Bothling U: The first international glaucoma conference in Hamburg. Z prakt Augenheilkd 18:199–204, 1997.
 Meyer-Bothling U: Emergencies in ophthalmology, Ch. 26, Block C. In: Emergency Medicine. Kühn D, Luxem J, Rungaldier K, (eds); Verlag Urban & Schwarzenberg, Munich, 1998.
 Meyer-Bothling U: Pathological findings in ophthalmology. In: OPHDA – Ophthalmology Photo Databank. Alcon. Georg Thieme Verlag Stuttgart und Enke Verlag Stuttgart, 1998.
 Meyer-Bothling U, Jørgensen JS, Mann M: Topical anaesthesia: Alternative to retro- or parabulbar anaesthesia in cataract surgery. Ophthalmo-Chirurgie 10: 204–208, 1998.
 Meyer-Bothling U: Emergencies in ophthalmology, Ch. 26, Block C. In: Emergency Medicine, 2nd edition. Kühn D, Luxem J, Rungaldier K, (eds); Verlag Urban & Schwarzenberg, Munich, 2001.
 Meyer-Bothling U, Cunningham C: Converting to topical anaesthesia in cataract surgery. Poster, Annual Congress, Royal College of Ophthalmologists, Birmingham, May 2001.
 Meyer-Bothling U: Emergencies in ophthalmology, Ch. 26, "Specialised emergency medicine". In: Emergency Medicine, 3rd edition. Kühn D, Luxem J, Rungaldier K, (eds); Elsevier, Munich, 2004.
 M J Saldanha and U Meyer-Bothling: Outcome of implementing the national services framework guidelines for diabetic retinopathy screening: results of an audit in a primary care trust. Br J Ophthalmol Jan 2006;90:122.
 Meyer-Bothling U: Emergencies in ophthalmology, Ch. 26, In: Emergency Medicine today, 5th edition. Kühn D, Luxem J, Rungaldier K, (eds); Elsevier, Munich, 2010.

References

External links 
 

British ophthalmologists
Year of birth missing (living people)
Living people
People educated at Atlantic College
People educated at a United World College